Nong Pla Lai railway station is a railway station located in Nong Pla Lai Subdistrict, Khao Yoi District, Phetchaburi.

Services 
 Ordinary 251/252 Bang Sue Junction-Prachuap Khiri Khan-Bang Sue Junction
 Ordinary 254 Lang Suan-Thon Buri
 Ordinary 261/262 Bangkok-Hua Hin-Bangkok

References 
 
 

Phetchaburi province
Railway stations in Thailand